New Hall may refer to:
 New Hall, Fazakerley, a historic complex that was originally a model village, in Liverpool, England
 New Hall, Woodford, a 17th-century cottage in Woodford, Greater Manchester, England
 New Hall moated site, a scheduled monument in Tyldesley, Greater Manchester, England
 New Hall Manor, a medieval manor house, now used as a hotel, in Sutton Coldfield, West Midlands, England
 New Hall Manor Estate, the younger of two housing estates in Walmley, West Midlands named after New Hall Manor 
 New Hall Estate, the older of two housing estates in Walmley, West Midlands named after New Hall Manor 
 Sutton New Hall (ward), an electoral ward in Birmingham, England, named after New Hall Manor
 New Hall School, an independent school in Boreham, Chelmsford, Essex, England
 New Hall, a Cambridge University college now known as Murray Edwards College, Cambridge
 New Hall, now known as Agnes Blackadder Hall, a hall of residence at the University of St Andrews, Scotland 
 HM Prison New Hall, a prison in Flockton, West Yorkshire, England

See also
 Newhall (disambiguation)
 New Town Hall (disambiguation)

Architectural disambiguation pages